Sud Mennucci is a municipality in the state of São Paulo, Brazil. The population is 7,728 (2020 est.) in an area of 595 km2. Altitude is 386 m.

The municipality became widely known as a pioneer in the free access of its population to a Wi-Fi municipal wireless network.

References

External links 
  Municipality of Sud Mennucci. Official home page.

Municipalities in São Paulo (state)